Vallikavu is a small village in Kollam District of Kerala. Vallikavu is chiefly inhabited by farmers, fishermen and other sections of the society. Fishermen here were traditional Canoe builders and are skilled at making Changadam Vallam (the present House-Boats) using planks and coir ropes to tie the planks together and coating the Vallam with melted pith. The Vallam making artisans have died and with the advent of motor transport the industry died.

The people of the village are very industrious and are good at various skills. The women used to collectively manufacture coir from the coconut, while few were engaged in making Mats out of Screw Pine. People of this village are literate and have contributed to the armed services, as many of them have worked in various armed forces for the country.

Vallikavu became world famous by the birth of Mata Amritanandamayi, the Hindu spiritual leader. Amrita Vishwa Vidyapeetham's Amritapuri Campus is situated here. Many people from different states and countries comes here for Amma's Dharshan. As many people came, Vallickavu developed to a small town in a short time span and shops, markets, textiles, etc. began to flourish. Many commercial banks set up their branches and the major one is the State Bank of India Vallikavu Branch on Cherukara Building.

Transportation
Trivandrum International Airport is the nearest airport. Karunagappally railway station serves Vallikavu as the nearest Railway station. Regular buses connect the village with Ernakulam, Alappuzha, Karunagappally, Ochira and Kayamkulam.

References

Cities and towns in Kollam district

ml:ചങ്ങംകുളങ്ങര